Kalamos was a town of ancient Thrace on the Bosphorus, inhabited during Roman times. 

Its site is located south of Kuruçeşme in European Turkey.

References

Populated places in ancient Thrace
Former populated places in Turkey
Roman towns and cities in Turkey
History of Istanbul Province